Allegory of Fertility and Abundance is a allegorical tempera on panel painting by Luca Signorelli, created c. 1500, now in the Uffizi in Florence. Produced around the same time as the artist's frescoes in the San Brizio Chapel in Orvieto, the work is a monochrome allegory inspired by classical bas-reliefs and intended for a humanist scholar's studiolo. Its figures refer to the artist's nudes in his frescoes at Orvieto and Madonna and Child with Ignudi.

References

16th-century allegorical paintings
Allegorical paintings by Italian artists
Paintings by Luca Signorelli
1500 paintings
Paintings in the collection of the Uffizi